Longzhou is a town and the seat of Xingtang County in southwestern Hebei province, China. , it has eight residential communities and 25 villages under its administration.

See also
List of township-level divisions of Hebei

References

Township-level divisions of Hebei